Shenzhong Township (Mandarin: 申中乡) is a township in Huangyuan County, Xining, Qinghai, China. In 2010, Shenzhong Township had a total population of 14,594: 7,470 males and 7,124 females: 2,596 aged under 14, 11,086 aged between 15 and 65 and 912 aged over 65.

References 
 

Township-level divisions of Qinghai
Xining